Clavelinidae is a family of tunicates in the order Enterogona. It describes a group of marine animals.

Genera
, WoRMS recognizes the following genera in the family Clavelinidae:
 Clavelina 
 Eudistoma  Euclavella? 
 Nephtheis 
 Pycnoclavella

References 

Aplousobranchia
Tunicate families
Taxa named by Sylvanus Charles Thorp Hanley